= Salome Gogiashvili =

Georgian actress and television host

Salome Gogiashvili სალომე გოგიაშვილი
- Born: 2 November 1984 (age 41); Tbilisi, Georgian SSR
- Occupations: television host; actress
- Years active: 2003–present

Salome Gogiashvili (Georgian: სალომე გოგიაშვილი; born 2 November 1984) is a Georgian actress and Television host. Her acting debut took place in the film Another Georgian Story, in 2003. She is currently the host of the program ''Story''.

Gogiashvili was born in the family of Tiniko Gogniashvili and Dato Gogiashvili. Her father Dato Gogiashvili was the singer of musical ensemble Georgian Voices.

Gogiashvili has four children.

== Filmography ==
As actress

- Another Georgian Story (2003)
- Marjvena Sanapiro (TV Movie) (2023)
